Ruutu+ Urheilu 2 is a Finnish TV channel that specializes in sports. Urheilukanava was launched on August 27, 2001 and it was especially popular among Finnish football fans since the channel made it possible to watch both high standard domestic and international football on TV for free. Urheilukanava was replaced by Nelonen Sport in February 2010. Nelonen Sport was renamed to Nelonen Pro 2 in January 2011 and it became a pay TV channel.

Current programming
The channel televises a variety of sports, including:

Ice Hockey
Delayed SM-liiga matches (The Match of the Month, semi-finals, finals - shown live on Nelonen Pro 1), live SM-liiga/Mestis qualification matches and a weekly highlights magazine.
Hockey Friday (Kiekkoperjantai) is a Friday night block, which shows matches from NHL, KHL and Swedish HockeyAllsvenskan. Also before the weekly match-up, there is an NHL magazine focusing on last week's highlights.
Red Bull Open Ice

Football
Serie A

Track & Field
IAAF Indoor Grand Prix' live and delayed 3-4 times a week.

Nelonen Pro 2 also televises floorball (both national and international), pesäpallo (Finnish variant of baseball), horse riding, basketball, MotoGP and a few other sporting events and magazines.

Former programming
Urheilukanava was especially popular among Finnish football fans since the channel has made it possible to watch both high standard domestic and international football on TV for free. These leagues have included the Finnish Veikkausliiga, Spanish La Liga, French Ligue 1, German Bundesliga, Swedish Allsvenskan, FA Cup and many others. It also used to show sports such as ice hockey (Mestis, SM-liiga, Swiss NLA, IIHF World Championships), volleyball (Finnish league, FIVB World League) and golf.

References

External links
www.nelonenpro.fi

Sports television networks
Television channels and stations established in 2001